Gusztáv Rózsahegyi (28 February 1901 – 9 January 1975) was a Hungarian sprinter. He competed in the men's 100 metres and the 4x100 metres relay events at the 1924 Summer Olympics.

References

External links
 

1901 births
1975 deaths
Athletes (track and field) at the 1924 Summer Olympics
Hungarian male sprinters
Olympic athletes of Hungary
Athletes from Budapest